Harrison County is the name of eight counties in the United States:

Harrison County, Indiana 
Harrison County, Iowa 
Harrison County, Kentucky 
Harrison County, Mississippi 
Harrison County, Missouri 
Harrison County, Ohio 
Harrison County, Texas 
Harrison County, West Virginia

United States county name disambiguation pages